SS Edward A. Filene was a Liberty ship built in the United States during World War II. She was named after Edward A. Filene, an American businessman and philanthropist. He is best known for building the Filene's department store chain and for his decisive role in pioneering credit unions across the United States.

Construction
Edward A. Filene was laid down on 9 February 1944, under a Maritime Commission (MARCOM) contract, MC hull 2472, by the St. Johns River Shipbuilding Company, Jacksonville, Florida; she was sponsored by Catherine Filene Shouse, the niece of the namesake, and was launched on 6 April 1944.

History
She was allocated to the American West African Line, Inc., on 20 April 1944. On 23 December 1948, she was laid up in the National Defense Reserve Fleet, Astoria, Oregon. On 28 July 1954, she was withdrawn from the fleet to be loaded with grain under the "Grain Program 1954", she returned loaded on 7 August 1954. On 9 December 1957, she was withdrawn to be unload, she returned on empty 13 December 1957. She was sold for nontransportation use, 30 December 1965, to Foss Launch and Tug Co., for $60,000. She was removed from the fleet on 11 February 1966. She was sunk at Cook Inlet, Alaska, as a breakwater and dock.

References

Bibliography

 
 
 
 

 

Liberty ships
Ships built in Jacksonville, Florida
1944 ships
Olympia Reserve Fleet
Olympia Reserve Fleet Grain Program
Ships sunk as breakwaters